The New Firm is the term used, hailing from the 1980s, to describe the rivalry between Scottish football clubs Aberdeen and Dundee United. Both clubs are located on the east coast of Scotland, in the third and fourth most populous cities respectively.

Although not traditionally a derby, with 65 miles separating both teams, the fixture was seen as a North-east of Scotland derby between the two most successful teams in Scotland outside of the Old Firm during the 1980s. Dundee United also have a more traditional rivalry with their close neighbours Dundee.

History
The term originated in the 1980s, when both clubs challenged the Old Firm for domestic trophies. The term was used by Evening Times and The Glasgow Herald.

The Old Firm have more often than not been the dominant force in Scottish Football, however throughout the 1980s both Aberdeen and Dundee United were more than a match for them, regularly beating them home and away and winning many of the trophies on offer.

Aberdeen were to win the Scottish Premier Division three times, the Scottish Cup four times, the Scottish League Cup twice, the European Cup Winners' Cup and the European Super Cup, all within the 1980s. In this same period, Dundee United won the Scottish Premier Division once and the Scottish League Cup twice, as well as reaching the Scottish Cup final four times, the 1987 UEFA Cup Final, and the semi-final of the 1983–84 European Cup. Not only were the Old Firm not dominating the title race, but for three seasons in a row, 1983 through to 1985, the league title went to either Aberdeen or Dundee United, meaning for the first time two other teams were dominating Scottish Football.

Both sides' success was limited as they entered the 1990s, with Aberdeen winning both cups in 1989–90, reaching both finals in 1992–93, as well as almost winning the league in 1991, while Dundee United were Scottish Cup finalists in 1991 and finally winners in 1994. However, in the 1994–95 season both sides fought relegation (with United going down), and although Aberdeen won the Scottish League Cup in 1995 and Dundee United the Scottish Cup again in 2010, neither side has managed to be a consistent force for Rangers and Celtic to reckon with, and Aberdeen's league success in 1984–85 is the last time a non-Old Firm club won the Scottish league title.

Since 2010 however, the sides have seen a divergence in fortunes, as Aberdeen capitalised on Rangers' implosion to win the Scottish League Cup in 2014 and finish runners-up behind Celtic for four years running between 2014–15 and 2017–18 (losing three cup finals to the same club in that period), while Dundee United were relegated from the top flight in 2016 having lost the 2014 Scottish Cup Final to a local rival, St Johnstone.

Domestic head-to-head
In domestic head-to-head matches, the teams have played each other 246 times, Aberdeen winning 98 compared to United's 79. Aberdeen have won more league and Scottish Cup matches while United have won more League Cup matches between the two.

Given their mutual success particularly in the 1980s, it is perhaps surprising that the only major final featuring both clubs is the 1979–80 Scottish League Cup Final, won by Dundee United in a replay at Dens Park after a draw in Glasgow.

After 8 October 2022:

League competition

Scottish Premiership Table (2013/14-present – 5 Seasons)

As of 16 May 2018:

SPL Table (1998/99-2012/13 – 15 Seasons)

European competition

As of 9 August 2012:

Players at both clubs
Nine players have signed for Dundee United directly from Aberdeen, the last being in 2000. Ten have made the opposite journey from Tannadice to Pittodrie, with five since August 2005.

Aberdeen to Dundee United

Dundee United to Aberdeen

Complete list
In addition, other players have played for both clubs without moving directly between them. A list of all players to have played at least one first-team game for both clubs is displayed below.

  Scottish
 Jim Bett
 Craig Brewster
 Jamie Buchan
 Stevie Crawford
 Billy Dodds
 Davie Dodds
 Stuart Duff
 Fraser Fyvie
 John Gardiner
 David Goodwillie
 Jim Hamilton
 Jim Henry
 Mark Kerr
 Lee Mair
 Stewart McKimmie

 Gary Mackay-Steven
 Ray McKinnon
 Jamie McQuilken
 Joe Miller
 Lee Miller
 Charlie Mulgrew
 Frank Munro
 Mark Perry
 Barry Robson
 Cammy Smith
 Derek Stillie
 Lewis Thom
 Billy Williamson
 Robbie Winters
 Stephen Wright
 Lawrence Shankland
 Peter Pawlett

  Finnish
 Mixu Paatelainen

  Republic of Ireland
 Willo Flood

  Northern Irish
 Danny Griffin
 Michael O'Neill

Player records
A list of players to have scored in derby matches between the two from 27 August 1994 up to 20 November 2021 is below:

For both clubs

Aberdeen goalscorers

Dundee United goalscorers

Partial game list
Fixtures from 27 August 1994 to the present day featuring League games, Scottish Cup and League Cup matches.

Aberdeen wins are coloured in red, United wins in tangerine and draws are grey.

References

External links
 Soccerbase list of New Firm meetings
 BBC's 'A Sporting Nation' New Firm article

Scotland football derbies
Aberdeen F.C.
Dundee United F.C.
Recurring sporting events established in 1925